Triton Airlines was an airline based in St. John's, Newfoundland, Canada operated by Jason and Javis Roberts from February 1993 to October 1994.

Fleet
 Boeing 737

See also 
 List of defunct airlines of Canada

References

External links
Travel Central Newfoundland
Canadian Transportation Agency: February 19, 1993
Canadian Transportation Agency: October 3, 1994

Defunct airlines of Canada
Airlines established in 1993
Airlines disestablished in 1994
1993 establishments in Newfoundland and Labrador
1994 disestablishments in Newfoundland and Labrador
Defunct companies of Newfoundland and Labrador